Lectionary 156, designated by siglum ℓ 156 (in the Gregory-Aland numbering) is a Greek manuscript of the New Testament, on parchment leaves. Paleographically it has been assigned to the 10th century.

Description 

The codex contains Lessons from the Acts and Epistles lectionary (Apostolarion).
It is written in Greek minuscule letters, on 271 parchment leaves (24.2 cm by 18.1 cm), in two columns per page, 22 lines per page. It contains music notes.

10 leaves on the beginning were supplied on paper in the 16th century.

History 

The manuscript once was a part of Colbert's collection. Gregory assigned it by 33a. It was examined by Paulin Martin.

The manuscript is not cited in the critical editions of the Greek New Testament (UBS3), but it was used for the Editio Critica Maior.

Currently the codex is located in the Bibliothèque nationale de France (Gr. 382) at Paris.

See also 

 List of New Testament lectionaries
 Biblical manuscript
 Textual criticism

Notes and references 

Greek New Testament lectionaries
10th-century biblical manuscripts